Attiliosa ruthae is a species of sea snail, a marine gastropod mollusk in the family Muricidae, the murex snails or rock snails.

Description

Distribution

References

 Houart, R., 1996. Description of new species of Muricidae (Gastropoda) from New Caledonia, the Philippine Islands, the northeast Atlantic and west Africa. Apex 11(2): 59–75

External links
 MNHN, Paris: holotype

Attiliosa
Gastropods described in 1996